The Files: The Greatest Hits is a compilation album released by Puerto Rican rap singer Vico C.

Track listing
 "Tony Presidio"
 "Emboscada"
 "X-Plosión"
 "Aquel Que Había Muerto"
 "Viernes 13"
 "Bomba Para Afincar"
 "En Honor A La Verdad"
 "She Likes My Reggae"
 "5 De Septiembre" (Acoustic Version)
 "Quieren"
 "El Bueno, El Malo, Y El Feo" (Dance Hall Version)
 "Cosa Nuestra"
 "La Recta Final" (Nueva Version)
 "Super Héroe"

Song meanings
 "Viernes 13" (In English, "Friday the 13th") was one of the first hits from Vico C. It features Vico C and his girlfriend running from Jason Voorhees, the killer from the Friday the 13th films.
 "5 de Septiembre" (In English, "September 5th") is dedicated to Vico C's daughter. It's her birthdate and it talks of how he feels about not being with her during her childhood.
 "El Bueno, El Malo, y el Feo" (In English, "The Good, the Bad and the Ugly") features Eddie Dee and Tego Calderón personifying "The Good", "The Bad" and "The Ugly" respectively. Vico C himself personifies "The Good". The song talks of how different people react to different things in the music business.

2004 greatest hits albums
Vico C albums